Jalalaqsi District is a district in the central Hiran region of Somalia. It has its capital at Jalalaqsi.

Villages 

 Bilaal
 Jalalaqsi

References

Districts of Somalia
Administrative map of Jalalaqsi District

Districts of Somalia
Hiran, Somalia